Georgia's trunk highways form a network of internationally oriented roads that connects the Georgian capital of Tbilisi, home to roughly a third of the national population, with neighboring countries. This is the backbone for a network of domestic trunk roads connecting vital regions with each other and the capital. The roads of "international importance" and "national importance" are managed by the Roads Department (Georoad) of the Ministry of Regional Development and Infrastructure of Georgia.

Roads of international importance
The "roads of international importance" are the highest category of roads in Georgia. They are denoted by the prefix ს (Georgian for S), which stands for "საერთაშორისო მნიშვნელობის გზა" (Saertashoriso mnishvnelobis gza, road of international importance). Direction and destination signs in Georgia are in both Georgian and Latin scripts, but the prefix is ​​only displayed in Georgian. Article 3.3 of the law on motor roads defines that: 
 roads of international importance include roads connecting the administrative, important industrial and cultural centers of Georgia and other countries.

About  kilometers of the central east-west S1 and a limited section of the S12 has been upgraded to expressway or motorway with two lanes in each direction. The S4 and S5 trunk routes also have multiple lanes over a limited length.

The S1 and S10 are partially located in South Ossetia and Abkhazia regions, over which the Georgian government exercises no authority. At the de facto boundary lines the roads are closed in both directions.

Roads of domestic importance

They are denoted by the prefix შ (Georgian for Sh), which stands for "შიდასახელმწიფოებრივი მნიშვნელობის გზა" (Shidasakhelmts’ipoebrivi mnishvnelobis gza, "road of domestic importance"). The use of the road numbers on direction signs is inconsistent and varies widely, including on trunk Sh roads.
Article 3.4 of the law on motor roads defines roads of domestic importance as: 
 roads connecting with important industrial and cultural centers of the capital of Georgia, administrative centers of the Autonomous Republics and administrative centers of the municipality, as well as their bypasses and access to them from highways of international and domestic importance;
 roads connecting the administrative centers of the Autonomous Republics, the administrative centers of the municipalities, the important industrial and cultural centers of Georgia;
 roads connecting airports and ports with the capital of Georgia, administrative centers of autonomous republics and municipalities.

The quality of Sh-roads varies from excellent to very poor. Since 2006 however, priority has been given to improve regional connections, which has accelerated from 2014 onwards. The quality of the regional road network improves over the years, but large parts remain in mediocre, poor and/or unpaved condition and suffer from harsh climatic conditions, especially in the mountainous areas. The infamous "road to Omalo" (Sh44) to Tusheti National Park is the most extreme example of that.

1-50

51-100

101-150

151-200

201-209

The tables above are based on the 2022 published list of roads by the Government of Georgia.

See also
 (doc) Complete official list of Georgian Highways - 2022 update as attached to resolution 372, 18 July 2022.
 Roads Department of the Ministry of Regional Development and Infrastructure of Georgia

References

 
Georgia
roads
Roads